Shayne Nxumalo is a Zimbabwean cricketer. He made his first-class debut on 3 March 2020, for Matabeleland Tuskers in the 2019–20 Logan Cup.

References

External links
 

Year of birth missing (living people)
Living people
Zimbabwean cricketers
Matabeleland Tuskers cricketers
Place of birth missing (living people)